James Parker Austin (born December 7, 1963) is a former baseball pitcher who played for the Milwaukee Brewers from 1991 to 1993.

Career
Austin made his major league debut for the Milwaukee Brewers on July 4, 1991, after spending 6 seasons in the minors with the San Diego Padres and Brewers organizations. Austin had an excellent 1992 season with Milwaukee, posting a record of 5–2 with a 1.85 ERA. Shortly afterwards an arm injury derailed his major league career. After his injury, Austin played for the Triple-A Buffalo Bisons in the Cleveland Indians organization in 1995, the Triple-A Pawtucket Red Sox of the Boston Red Sox organization in 1996, and in the Chinese Professional Baseball League for the Wei Chuan Dragons in 1997 before his career ended.

References

External links

1963 births
Living people
Milwaukee Brewers players
Wichita Pilots players
Riverside Red Wave players
Stockton Ports players
El Paso Diablos players
Charleston Rainbows players
Spokane Indians players
Pawtucket Red Sox players
New Orleans Zephyrs players
Buffalo Bisons (minor league) players
VCU Rams baseball players
Major League Baseball pitchers
Baseball players from Virginia
People from Farmville, Virginia
American expatriate baseball players in Mexico
American expatriate baseball players in Taiwan
Denver Zephyrs players
Rieleros de Aguascalientes players
Sultanes de Monterrey players
Wei Chuan Dragons players